Phil Olaleye is a United States politician and the former executive director of a non-profit educational foundation.

He was elected on November 8, 2022 as a legislator at the 2022 US midterm elections representing Georgia House of Representatives District 59 under the Democratic Party, and he took office on January 9, 2023.

Early life and education
Phil grew up in Stone Mountain, Georgia. In 2007, he received his first degree from Duke University and in 2014 he earned his Master's degree in public policy from the Harvard Kennedy School of Government.

References 

Living people
Duke University alumni
Harvard Kennedy School alumni
Democratic Party members of the Georgia House of Representatives
Year of birth missing (living people)